Croatia entered the Eurovision Song Contest for the first time as an independent country in 1993. The country's first entry was by Put with the song "Don't Ever Cry".

Background

Croatia first entered the Eurovision Song Contest in 1993, having previously competed as a part of Yugoslavia from 1961 to 1991. SR Croatia was the most successful republic of Yugoslavia at Eurovision, with 11 of the 27 entries that won the Yugoslavian selection for the Eurovision Song Contest being Croatian.

During the disintegration of Yugoslavia the state broadcaster at the time, JRT, decided to continue Yugoslavia's participation in the contest, holding one last national final for the 1992 Contest, held on 28 March 1992. Only artists from the republics of Serbia, Montenegro and Bosnia and Herzegovina competed, despite the former declaring independence on 1 March. Artists from Croatia, Slovenia and Macedonia did not compete after declaring independence from Yugoslavia in 1991. The winning song was "Ljubim te pesmama" by Extra Nena, representing Serbia. However, by the time Extra Nena competed at Eurovision for Yugoslavia, the Socialist Federal Republic of Yugoslavia was no more, and a new republic, the Federal Republic of Yugoslavia, had been formed.

Croatia's former sub-national broadcaster RTV Zagreb became the country's national broadcaster, renamed Hrvatska radiotelevizija (HRT). The broadcaster first attempted to enter the Eurovision Song Contest as an independent nation in 1992, holding a national contest to select a song. However, as the broadcaster was not a member of the European Broadcasting Union (EBU) at the time they were refused entry to the contest. The winner of the contest was Magazin with the song "Hallelujah". The broadcaster became a member of the European Broadcasting Union (EBU) on 1 January 1993, allowing it to compete in the Eurovision Song Contest for the first time as an independent nation in 1993. The Croatian national broadcaster, Croatian Radiotelevision (HRT), broadcasts the event within Croatia and organises the selection process for the nation's entry. HRT confirmed their intentions to participate at the Eurovision Song Contest 1993 on 14 November 1992. Along with their participation confirmation, it was announced that a national final will be held to select the Croatian entry.

Before Eurovision

Dora 1993 
To select its entry for the Eurovision Song Contest 1993, HRT hosted a national final on 28 February 1993 at the Crystal Ballroom of Hotel Kvarner in Opatija. National final was hosted by Sanja Dolezal and Frano Lasic. Prior to the event, 134 songs had been submitted to the broadcaster; sixteen candidate entries were then selected by a jury panel, consisting of Milan Mitrovic, Mario Bogliuni, Kresimir Oblak, Tomislav Ivcic, Aleksandar Kostadinov and Drago Britvic, from the received submissions. One song was later disqualified and ultimately  fifteen remaining entries competed with the winning song chosen by 11 regional jury panels. At the close of voting, "Don't ever cry" performed by Put received the most votes and was selected as the Croatian entry. In addition to the performances of the competing entries, Sanja Dolezal, Frano Lasic, Ivo Robic, Tomislav Ivcic, Rajko Djmic, Tereza Kesovija, Daniel Popovic, 1986 Yugoslavian representative Doris Dragovic and 1989 Eurovision winner for Yugoslavia Riva, performed as special guests.

At Kvalifikacija za Millstreet 
By 1992 an increasing number of countries had begun expressing an interest in participating in the Eurovision Song Contest; this increase was the result of new countries being formed following the breakup of Yugoslavia and dissolution of the Soviet Union and as part of revolutions leading to the fall of communist regimes in Europe which took place in the late 1980s and early 1990s. In order to determine which countries would progress to the contest proper, a preselection round was held for the first time in the contest's history, with the top three countries in this round progressing to compete in the Eurovision Song Contest 1993. Preselection round, entitled , took place in Ljubljana, Slovenia and was produced by the Slovenian public broadcaster  (RTV SLO). Performing during the show in position 2, following Bosnia and Herzegovina and preceding Estonia, Croatia received 51 points, placing 3rd and subsequently qualifying to the Eurovision Song Contest proper alongside Slovenia and Bosnia and Herzegovina.

Voting

At Eurovision 
Put performed 21st at the Eurovision Song Contest 1993 in Millstreet, Ireland, following the Netherlands and preceding Spain. Despite being a favourite to win the contest, the group received only 31 points, placing 15th of the 25 competing countries. The Croatian jury awarded its 12 points to Norway.

Voting

References

Works cited

External links 
Croatian National Final 1993

1993
Countries in the Eurovision Song Contest 1993
Eurovision